The American Idiot World Tour was a concert tour by American punk band Green Day in support of the group's seventh studio album, American Idiot, which was released in September 2004.  The tour began in Los Angeles at the Grand Olympic Auditorium on July 29, and the last show was in Australia at the Telstra Dome. During the tour, the band played at the 2004 Reading Festival in England.

During the tour, Green Day recorded a live album, Bullet in a Bible, which was released in 2005, as a CD/DVD set. The concert at which the album was recorded was in England, at the Milton Keynes National Bowl, and was attended by more than 130,000 people. The DVD sold more than 1,500,000 copies and went Platinum in the UK and in the United States.

Background
Dates for the second North America leg was announced in February 2005, and lasted from April to May 2005. The third North American leg was announced in May 2005.

Opening acts
Opening acts included New Found Glory, Kaiser Chiefs, My Chemical Romance, Simple Plan, Sugarcult, Jimmy Eat World and Against Me!.

Main setlist
The setlist throughout the tour remained mostly the same. Green Day commonly played several songs from American Idiot, Dookie, Insomniac, Nimrod and Warning. Ever since the Fort Worth, Texas, USA concert in October 19, 2004.
"American Idiot"
"Jesus of Suburbia"
"Holiday"
"Are We the Waiting"
"St. Jimmy"
"Longview"
"Hitchin' A Ride"
"Brain Stew"
"Jaded"
"Knowledge"
"Basket Case"
"She"
"King for a Day"
"Shout/Stand By Me"
"Wake Me Up When September Ends"
"Minority"
Encore
 "Maria"
"Boulevard of Broken Dreams"
"Homecoming"
"We Are the Champions"
"Good Riddance (Time of Your Life)"

Tour dates

List of festivals

Personnel
Billie Joe Armstrong – Lead vocals, lead and rhythm guitar
Mike Dirnt – Bass, backing vocals, lead vocals on "Homecoming" (Nobody likes you)
Tré Cool – Drums, percussion, backing vocals on "King For A Day/Shout", lead vocals on "Homecoming" (Rock'n'roll Girlfriend)
Jason White – Lead and rhythm guitar, backing vocals
Jason Freese – Keyboards, saxophone, trombone, accordion, acoustic guitar, backing vocals
Kurt Lohmiller – (July 2004 – Late January 2005) – backing vocals, percussion, trumpet
Ronnie Blake – (Late January 2005  – December 2005) – backing vocals, percussion, trumpet
Mike Pelino (September 2004 & April 2005 – December 2005) – Rhythm guitar, backing vocals on "St. Jimmy"
Bobby Schneck (October 2004 – March 2005) – Rhythm guitar, backing vocals on "St. Jimmy"

References

External links
 

2004 concert tours
2005 concert tours
Green Day concert tours